Adoxobotys is a genus of moths of the family Crambidae.

Species
Adoxobotys cacidus Strand, 1907
Adoxobotys cristobalis 
Adoxobotys discordalis (Dyar, 1914)

References

Pyraustinae
Crambidae genera
Taxa named by Eugene G. Munroe